"Yes or Yes" (stylized as "YES or YES") is a song recorded by South Korean girl group Twice. It was released by JYP Entertainment on November 5, 2018, as the lead single from the group's sixth extended play, Yes or Yes.

Background 
In early October 2018, advertisements with the phrase "Do you like Twice? Yes or Yes" were put up on subway billboards, drawing attention online. On October 11, JYP Entertainment confirmed that Twice planned to release their third Korean album of the year on November 5. The lead single's name, "Yes or Yes", along with the identical album name, was revealed on October 20 in a short clip which was part of a special video commemorating Twice's third anniversary.

To promote the song, JYP Entertainment released a set of three teasers, composed of three versions "Y", "E" and "S", on October 28, 29 and 30, respectively. The teasers feature connected content, introducing the viewers to a creepy forest where Jeongyeon drives a car toward "TWICE Square". Then Mina appears, saying "Hey boy! Look, I'm gonna make this simple for you. You got two choices: Yes, or yes", and the members perform the song's dance. On November 3, another video was released previewing all tracks from the album, including the song "Yes or Yes".

Composition
"Yes or Yes" was composed by David Amber and Andy Love, with lyrics by Sim Eun-jee. David Amber previously co-composed "Heart Shaker" and Sim Eun-jee co-wrote lyrics for "Knock Knock". "Yes or Yes" was described as a bright and lively "color pop" song with influences from Motown, reggae and arena pop. Lyrically, it is about only being able to reply "yes" to a confession of love.

Music video
The music video for the song was made by Naive, the team that had already produced a number of music videos for Twice at the time. According to YouTube's official report, the video achieved 31.4 million views on this platform within the first 24 hours of release, becoming the seventh biggest 24-hour YouTube debut of all time. Moreover, Twice became the fastest K-pop girl group to reach 10 million views on YouTube, in only six hours and two minutes. The video reached 100 million views on December 14, achieving the group's milestone of ten consecutive music videos surpassing 100 million views. On April 12, 2021, the video hit 300 million views on YouTube.

The video features strong choreography, showing nine girls facing their feelings by means of a fortune-telling crystal ball after the ride driven by Jeongyeon appears on the scene, with the girls dancing at the "TWICE Square" fairground. Twice's members are dressed in '90s-inspired outfits, abundant with plaid, argyle, and leather.

Japanese version
On January 9, 2019, JYP Entertainment announced Twice's release of their second compilation album named #Twice2 for March 6. The album, containing ten tracks with both Korean and Japanese versions of five songs, also includes "Yes or Yes". The lyrics were written by Yuka Matsumoto, and the songwriter of the Korean version of the song, Sim Eun-jee.

Commercial performance
"Yes or Yes" debuted on top of the Gaon Digital Chart and at number 2 on the Billboard K-pop Hot 100. The song also peaked at number 5 both on Billboard's World Digital Song Sales and Japan Hot 100 charts, and at number 14 on the Oricon Digital Singles chart.

The song surpassed 100 million streams in August 2019. It was the group's second single to become certified Platinum for streaming by the Korea Music Content Association (KMCA) since certifications were introduced in April 2018.

In April 2020, "Yes or Yes" received Silver streaming certification for surpassing 30 million streams on the Oricon Streaming Singles Chart by the Recording Industry Association of Japan (RIAJ).

Charts

Weekly charts

Year-end charts

Certifications

|-
!scope="col" colspan="3"| Download
|-

|-

|-

Accolades

See also
 List of certified songs in South Korea
 List of Gaon Digital Chart number ones of 2018
 List of M Countdown Chart winners (2018)

References

2018 songs
Twice (group) songs
Korean-language songs
JYP Entertainment singles